Curry County is the southwesternmost county in the U.S. state of Oregon. As of the 2020 census, the population was 23,446. The county seat is Gold Beach. The county is named for George Law Curry, a two-time governor of the Oregon Territory. Curry County includes the Brookings, OR Micropolitan Statistical Area.

Geography

The county contains significant forests, with occurrence of black oak, big leaf maple and Douglas-fir. The blue oak, prevalent slightly further south does not reach into Curry County.

Adjacent counties
 Coos County (north)
 Douglas County (northeast)
 Josephine County (east)
 Del Norte County, California (south)

National protected areas
Oregon Islands National Wildlife Refuge
Siskiyou National Forest (part)

Demographics

2000 census
As of the census of 2000, there were 21,137 people, 9,543 households, and 6,183 families living in the county. The population density was 13 people per square mile (5/km2). There were 11,406 housing units at an average density of 7 per square mile (3/km2). The racial makeup of the county was 92.89% White, 0.15% Black or African American, 2.14% Native American, 0.70% Asian, 0.11% Pacific Islander, 1.11% from other races, and 2.90% from two or more races. 3.60% of the population were Hispanic or Latino of any race. 20.1% were of German, 13.8% English, 10.3% United States or American and 9.9% Irish ancestry. 95.9% spoke English and 2.5% Spanish as their first language.

There were 9,543 households, out of which 20.90% had children under the age of 18 living with them, 54.50% were married couples living together, 7.20% had a female householder with no husband present, and 35.20% were non-families. 29.70% of all households were made up of individuals, and 14.70% had someone living alone who was 65 years of age or older. The average household size was 2.19 and the average family size was 2.66.

In the county, the population was spread out, with 19.20% under the age of 18, 4.80% from 18 to 24, 20.00% from 25 to 44, 29.40% from 45 to 64, and 26.60% who were 65 years of age or older. The median age was 49 years. For every 100 females there were 96.60 males. For every 100 females age 18 and over, there were 94.80 males.

The median income for a household in the county was $30,117, and the median income for a family was $35,627. Males had a median income of $31,772 versus $22,416 for females. The per capita income for the county was $18,138. About 9.70% of families and 12.20% of the population were below the poverty line, including 13.60% of those under age 18 and 10.60% of those age 65 or over.

2010 census
As of the 2010 census, there were 22,364 people, 10,417 households, and 6,347 families living in the county. The racial makeup of the county was 92.0% white, 1.9% American Indian, 0.7% Asian, 0.3% black or African American, 0.1% Pacific islander, 1.3% from other races, and 3.7% from two or more races. Those of Hispanic or Latino origin made up 5.4% of the population. In terms of ancestry, 26.3% were German, 16.2% were English, 14.1% were Irish, 6.2% were American, and 5.2% were Swedish.

Of the 10,417 households, 18.9% had children under the age of 18 living with them, 48.6% were married couples living together, 8.4% had a female householder with no husband present, 39.1% were non-families, and 32.4% of all households were made up of individuals. The average household size was 2.12 and the average family size was 2.62. The median age was 53.5 years.

The median income for a household in the county was $37,469 and the median income for a family was $53,340. Males had a median income of $41,667 versus $27,188 for females. The per capita income for the county was $23,842. About 9.2% of families and 13.9% of the population were below the poverty line, including 19.0% of those under age 18 and 8.0% of those age 65 or over.

Communities

Cities
Brookings
Gold Beach (county seat)
Port Orford

Census-designated places
Harbor
Langlois
Nesika Beach
Pistol River

 Wedderburn

Unincorporated communities

Agness
Bagnell Ferry
Carpenterville
Denmark
Hunter Creek
Illahe
Marial
Ophir
Plum Trees
Sixes

Politics
Curry County, like most of southwestern Oregon, is a solidly Republican county, although in part due to a more-liberal lean in the city of Port Orford, it does not give so small a proportion of its vote to Democrats as Eastern Oregon does. No Democratic presidential candidate has obtained an absolute majority in Curry County since Lyndon Johnson's 1964 landslide, and the county has been carried by Democrats for Presidents twice since, with only one of these being after the "Reagan Revolution". This occurred when Bill Clinton obtained a 32-vote plurality over George H. W. Bush in a three-way contest with billionaire businessman Ross Perot in 1992.

In the United States House of Representatives, Curry County is located in Oregon's 4th congressional district, which also includes the more left-leaning Eugene metropolitan area and has thus been represented by Democrat Peter DeFazio since 1987. In the Oregon State Senate, Curry County is located in the 1st Senate District, represented by Republican Dallas Heard. In the Oregon House of Representatives, it is located in the 1st District, represented by Republican David Brock Smith.

Political culture

Economy

After discovery of gold and other precious metals along the beaches and rivers of Curry County in the mid-19th century, white settlements developed along the coast. Traveling mainly by water or by coast-hugging land routes, residents remained relatively isolated from the rest of Oregon until the 20th century. As mining declined in the region, the economy became more dependent on farming, livestock grazing, forest products such as Port Orford cedar (also known as Lawson's cypress) and myrtlewood, and tourism. Blueberries and nursery plants are among the important farm products, and most of the Easter lilies grown in the United States come from Curry County.

In 2001, the native tanoak in the county were afflicted by sudden oak death, caused by infection of Phytophthora ramorum. The pathogen, which by 2016 had killed hundreds of thousands of tanoaks in the county, thrives in moist places along the coast. It has killed other kinds of oaks such as California black oak in a region that includes many California counties as well as Curry County, and it has infected and damaged a variety of conifers and shrubs such as camellia. In Curry County, it threatens timber production, plant nurseries, and Christmas tree farms.

As of 2012, the Federal government owned 66 percent of the land in Curry County, while 22 percent was owned by private forest interests. About 7 percent was being farmed; the state of Oregon owned 1 percent, and 4 percent was devoted to other uses.

The Port of Brookings Harbor, a shallow-draft harbor at the mouth of the Chetco River, is considered one of the safest harbors on the coast. It is listed as a Harbor of Refuge by the United States Coast Guard.

Media
 Curry County Reporter
 Curry Coastal Pilot

Education
School districts include:
 Brookings-Harbor School District 17
 Central Curry School District 1
 Port Orford-Langlois School District 2J

In 1997 the following districts merged into Central Curry: the Agness, Ophir, Pistol River, and Riley Creek elementary districts and the Gold Beach Union High School District.

The entire county is in the Southwestern Oregon Community College district.

See also

 National Register of Historic Places listings in Curry County, Oregon
 Siskiyou National Forest
 USS Curry County (LST-685)

References

Further reading

External links

Official county website

 
1855 establishments in Oregon Territory